The broadcast network Network Ten has televised the Olympic Games three times in Australia. Ten first televised the Winter Olympic Games in 2014 and the Summer Olympic Games in 1984.

Overview
Ten had exclusive Australian free-to-air, online and mobile telephony broadcast rights to the 2014 Winter Olympics in Sochi, the live telecast of the XXII Olympiad.

On 14 May 2013, the International Olympic Committee announced that Network Ten had secured broadcasting rights for the 2014 Winter Olympics.

Broadcast rights history

Staff and Commentators

2014 Winter Olympics
 Stephen Quartermain
 Mel McLaughlin 
 Alisa Camplin 
 Brad McEwan 
 Greg Rust
 Nicole Livingstone 
 Steven Bradbury 
 Steven Lee
 David Culbert
 Steph Hickey
 Mitch Tomlinson
 Luke Kneller
 Michael Kennedy
 Lachie Reid
 Rob Waters
 Mark Howard
 Magdalena Roze
 Nuala Hafner
 Mazoe Ford 
 Danielle Isdale
 Scott Mackinnon
 Matt Doran
 Melinda Nucifora
 Max Futcher
 Roy & H.G

See also
Olympics on Nine
Olympics on Seven
Olympics on Australian television
Australia at the Olympics

References

Ten
10 Sport
Network 10 original programming
1984 Australian television series debuts
2014 Australian television series endings
Ten